Olde is the surname of:

 Barney Olde (1882–1932), Australian politician
 Erika Olde, Canadian film producer, financier and billionaire heiress
 Hans Olde (1855–1917), German painter and art school administrator
 Margareth Olde (born 2000), Estonian chess Woman FIDE Master
 Neil Leverne Olde (1904–1969), Canadian politician

See also
 Old (disambiguation)
 Olds (disambiguation)